David Josué Jiménez Silva (born 8 January 1986) is a Spanish professional footballer who plays for La Liga club Real Sociedad. Silva plays mainly as a central or an attacking midfielder but can also play as a winger or second striker. He is predominantly a left-footed player and his passing ability and possession-retaining qualities have earned him the nicknames "Merlin" and "El Mago" from his teammates and fans. He is considered to be one of the greatest midfielders of his generation.

Silva spent seven years of his professional career with Valencia CF, appearing in more than 160 games and winning a Copa del Rey in 2008. In the summer of 2010, he moved to Manchester City and has since appeared in over 400 matches. With them he has won two FA Cups, five League Cups and four Premier League titles. He is regarded as one of Manchester City's greatest ever players alongside Billy Meredith, Bert Trautmann, Colin Bell, Vincent Kompany and Sergio Agüero. Silva has been named in the PFA Team of the Year three times. On 26 June 2019, Silva announced that he would leave Manchester City at the end of the 2019–20 season, ending his ten-season tenure at the club. On 28 September 2019, he became the youngest player to reach 200 wins in the Premier league, breaking the record set by Chelsea defender John Terry.

Silva also represented Spain, from his debut for the senior team in 2006 until his international retirement in 2018. He formed a midfield partnership with Xavi and Andrés Iniesta which led to three consecutive international tournament victories – UEFA Euro 2008, 2010 FIFA World Cup, and UEFA Euro 2012.  He is one of 13 Spanish players to have amassed 100 caps, he scored 35 goals in his international career, making him the 4th highest goalscorer in Spain's history, and also provided 29 assists, making him the second-highest assist provider in Spain's history.

Early life
Silva was born in Arguineguín, Gran Canaria, Canary Islands, to Fernando Jiménez, a former municipal police officer who eventually was responsible for the safety of the Valencia CF stadium and Eva Silva. His father, Fernando, is Spanish (Canarian) while his mother, Eva, is of Japanese descent, claimed by the Canarian media.

Silva began playing football in the youth team of UD San Fernando, near Maspalomas. Originally, he played as a goalkeeper, before becoming a winger and mirrored his game around his footballing idol as a youth, Michael Laudrup. When he was 14, he received an offer to become a youth player at Valencia CF, which he accepted. He stayed in Valencia's youth set-up until he was 17.

Club career

Valencia
A product of Valencia's youth system, Silva made his professional debut in 2004–05, with Segunda División's Eibar, while on loan from Valencia, playing 35 league games and scoring on five occasions. In the following season, he was again out on loan, this time to Celta de Vigo, where he played 34 matches, scoring four goals. After two late substitute appearances, the first in a 2–0 home win over Málaga on 28 August 2005, Silva finished as an undisputed starter as the Galician side reached the UEFA Cup straight from the second-tier.

Silva returned to Valencia in the summer of 2006, becoming an automatic first-choice despite his young age of 20. In two seasons combined, he only missed six matches and netted 14 goals, his first league goal coming on 5 November 2006 in a 1–1 draw at Espanyol. In August 2008, he extended his contract by five years, amidst interest of several Premier League teams. He won the Copa del Rey 2008, his first title in Spain.

After not appearing in the first three months of 2008–09 due to a chronic ankle ailment, Silva returned to the call-ups in mid-December. On 3 January 2009, he scored twice in a 3–1 home win over Atlético Madrid, still contributing with 19 matches (four goals) as the Che qualified for the Europa League.

In the 2009–10 season, Silva scored a career-best eight goals, as Valencia finished in third position and returned to the UEFA Champions League. On 15 April 2010, he scored a brace against Athletic Bilbao for a 2–0 home win, adding three assists in the 4–4 thriller at Werder Bremen for the Europa League's round of 16.

Manchester City

2010–11: Debut season, ending the trophy drought

On 30 June 2010, Manchester City announced that they had reached an agreement with Valencia over the transfer of Silva and that he would join the club on a four-year deal, prior to the start of the 2010–11 season. On 14 July, the Premier League side completed the signing and Silva was awarded the number 21 shirt, the same number he wore for Valencia and when playing for Spain. Manchester City had previously tried to sign Silva and his Valencia teammate David Villa in 2008, but were put off when Valencia quoted a £135 million combined price tag on both players.

City manager Roberto Mancini mainly deployed Silva as a winger and later in a trequartista role in his first season. Silva made his Premier League debut on 14 August 2010 in a 0–0 draw against Tottenham Hotspur at White Hart Lane. He scored his first goal for the club on 16 September, eight minutes into the Europa League group match against Red Bull Salzburg. On 17 October, he scored his first league goal in a game against Blackpool, netting City's third goal in a 3–2 away win. In a 3–1 home win in the Europa League against Lech Poznań, he set up two goals for Emmanuel Adebayor. He made another assist slipping through Adam Johnson for Manchester City's third in a 3–1 away win against West Ham United. Erroneous media reports emerged suggesting Silva could return to Spain and cited homesickness and difficulty to adapt to the English game. His performances, however, impressed City supporters and earned him three consecutive Manchester City Player of the Month awards from October to December 2010.

On 12 February 2011, he was credited for the equalising goal in the 2–1 loss to rivals Manchester United when an Edin Džeko shot deflected off his back and into the net. On 2 March, he scored from 20 yards out in an FA Cup win (3–0) against Aston Villa. Three days later, he scored the only goal in Manchester City's win against Wigan Athletic. Silva netted the third goal in City's 5–0 rout of Sunderland on 3 April. His assist to Yaya Touré against Everton at Goodison Park took Silva to 15 assists in all competitions for the season.

Following his debut season in the Premier League, Silva emerged as one of the league's finest playmakers. Carlos Tevez lauded him as "the best signing we [Manchester City] have made." Silva finished the 2010–11 campaign with four goals and seven assists in 35 league appearances.

2011–12: Premier League win, assist leader 

Silva began the 2011–12 season in fine form, scoring the third goal in City's 4–0 thrashing of Swansea City and was voted man of the match. He also scored the following week against Bolton Wanderers, and was again named man of the match. Silva then set up two of Sergio Agüero's three goals in City's second home game against Wigan Athletic. He was beginning to form a great understanding with the Argentine, with the pair having combined to score three goals already. After a series of magnificent displays from Silva, City boss Roberto Mancini compared him to fellow Spain internationals Xavi and Andrés Iniesta and said that Silva is "one of the best players in the world." On 1 October, Silva was awarded the Premier League Player of the Month for his outstanding performances, making it the first time ever that two Manchester City players have won the award in back-to-back months with Edin Džeko winning it the month before.

In the first Manchester Derby of the season at Old Trafford, Manchester City won 6–1, with Silva proving, yet again, to be instrumental in the Manchester City attack, scoring the fifth goal, setting up Edin Džeko's second with a chested volley pass through the United defense, and participating in the first two goals with excellent passing to James Milner to assist Mario Balotelli. He was described as having been "two steps ahead of all the United players" in the aftermath of the match. On 25 October 2011, in an interview with a Spanish radio station, Silva revealed that he turned down Barcelona and Real Madrid so he could sign for City, and that he wants to stay at the club for years. He commented, "Madrid and Barcelona are great teams, but I'm happy here and I would like to stay here for many years." Former City and England defender Earl Barrett said he is almost impossible to stop due to his ability to create space and Andy Cole, who mostly played for Manchester United, has stated that Silva "is a joy to watch."

Silva scored a goal in City's 3–2 away win against Queens Park Rangers on 5 November and also scored in City's 1–0 home win against Arsenal on 18 December. He also contributed by scoring the fourth goal in City's 4–0 win against West Bromwich Albion on 11 April 2012. Having done well to cut the gap between them and Manchester United to just three points, City went into April's Manchester Derby knowing that a win would be enough to send them top of the Premier League on goal difference. In a match widely billed as the biggest game in Premier League history, Silva delivered a corner which was headed home by Vincent Kompany for the winner. City triumphed 1–0, and returned to the league summit having been eight points behind their city rivals as recently as the start of that month.

On 13 May 2012, with City heading into the final day of the season needing a win over QPR to secure their first top flight title in 44 years, Silva delivered a cross for Edin Džeko to score the equaliser in the 91st minute of the match. In addition to winning his first Premier League medal with Manchester City, he also finished the season on top of the assists table with 15 assists to his name and was one of four City players who made it in the PFA's Premier League Team of the Year.

2012–13: Premier League, FA Cup runner-up 

On 17 September 2012, Silva signed a new five-year deal at City, committing himself to the Etihad Stadium until 2017.
Just six days after signing his new contract, Silva got off the mark in the 2012–13 Premier League season, registering an assist for Joleon Lescott in a 1–1 draw with Arsenal. He followed this up with another assist the following week, as he played in Aguero to score against Fulham at Craven Cottage. He injured himself playing for Spain in October, which meant he had to miss three games for Manchester City. On 11 November, he provided the crucial assist, a lofted through-ball, to striker Edin Džeko, who converted in the 88th minute to steal a 2–1 victory over Tottenham Hotspur. His first league goal of the season came in a 5–0 thrashing of Aston Villa at home in the very next league match, on 17 November.

On 19 January 2013, Silva scored twice against Fulham at home in a 2–0 win. On 9 March, he scored the fifth and final goal in Manchester City's 5–0 win against Barnsley at the City of Manchester Stadium in the quarter-finals of the FA Cup, sealing progression to the semi-finals. Despite missing the clash with Chelsea through injury, City prevailed 2-1 through goals from Aguero and Samir Nasri, leading them to their second FA Cup Final in three seasons. They would face relegation-threatened Wigan Athletic at Wembley. Silva started the match and played the full 90 minutes, but the Blues were rocked by a Pablo Zabaleta red card, with a late Ben Watson header compounding their misery. It was one of the great FA Cup upsets, and ended up costing City boss Mancini his job.

In the penultimate Premier League game against Reading, Silva made a superb pass to Džeko which took the entire Reading defense out of the game. Džeko scored, sealing a 0–2 win in City's first match since the sacking of Roberto Mancini. Silva finished the season with four goals and ten assists in 32 league appearances for a City squad that finished runners-up to city rivals Manchester United for the Premier League title.

2013–14: Premier League and League Cup double 
The 2013–14 Premier League season was a tough one for Silva, as numerous injuries limited him to just 27 league appearances. Nonetheless, he did well to maintain his stellar record of goals and assists for Manchester City. On 19 August 2013, Silva scored Manchester City's opening goal of the campaign in a 4–0 win against Newcastle United at the City of Manchester Stadium. He followed this up with an assist in the 3–2 defeat at Cardiff, crossing for Alvaro Negredo to score. On 5 October, Silva began one of his most productive spells in the Premier League. Making his first league start since August following a number of injury setbacks, he assisted Sergio Aguero to score against Everton, before scoring once and setting up another in a 3–1 victory over West Ham. Silva then scored again in the 7–0 home win over Norwich on 2 November, but his good form was curtailed by a calf injury, which ruled him out of City's next six games.

He made his return on 14 December, scoring at home in a 6–3 win over Arsenal, before setting up goals in each of the next two games against Fulham and Liverpool. Silva was also enjoying one of his most productive UEFA Champions League campaigns to date, having managed three assists and a goal in Group D, including a strike in a 3–2 win over champions Bayern Munich in December.

City had also progressed deep into the League Cup, eliminating Leicester and Newcastle to reach the semi-final, where they would face West Ham United. Silva played 73 minutes of the first leg, which City won by a large 6–0 scoreline, meaning he was rested for the return leg (a routine 3–0 win). He was restored to the starting lineup in the final, where goals from Yaya Touré, Nasri and substitute Jesús Navas earned City their first League Cup triumph since 1976.

The month of March was a productive one for Silva, as he registered two goals and two assists in the league, along with a slew of excellent performances. He was named Manchester City's Player of the Month for March 2014, after scoring in away matches against Hull City and Arsenal. Silva followed this up with a goal and assist against Liverpool at Anfield, but could not prevent the Blues slipping to a 3–2 defeat. However, following a strong run of form in the final five games of the season, City pipped the Merseysiders to the title, and Silva claimed his second Premier League winners medal to add to the one from 2011 to 2012. He ended the campaign with eight goals and 16 assists in all competitions.

2014–15: Contract extension, Premier League runner-up

On 10 August, Silva played in the 2014 FA Community Shield, a match City lost 3–0 to Arsenal. Two days later, he signed a five-year contract extension with City. Like the previous season, on 17 August, Silva scored Manchester City's opening goal of the 2014–15 Premier League season in a 2–0 away win against Newcastle United. Silva then scored against West Brom on Boxing Day.

On 21 February 2015, Silva scored a brace against Newcastle United in a 5–0 win. He won the Etihad Player of the Month award for his performances in February. On 4 March, Silva scored in 1–0 win against Leicester City to take him to ten league goals in a season for the first time in his career. Jamie Redknapp described him as a "maestro" for his performances for City, while his teammate Edin Džeko called him "the best player in the Premier League."

Three days later, City took on Barcelona at the Etihad Stadium in the first leg of their UEFA Champions League Round of 16 clash. The Blues were largely blown away by Barcelona's immense quality, but the game was marked by an ingenious backheel flick from Silva to Aguero, who scored to pull one back for City.

On 19 April, in a 2–0 victory over West Ham, Silva was caught in the face by the elbow of Cheikhou Kouyaté, requiring eight minutes of treatment before being substituted for Samir Nasri. Tests confirmed that he had not fractured his cheekbone.

On 10 May, Silva scored a goal in City's 6–0 win over Queens Park Rangers, which resulted in the latter's relegation. He ended the campaign with 12 goals and 10 assists in all competitions, with all 12 strikes coming in the Premier League- a career high.

2015–16: UEFA Champions League Semi-Final 
In the opening match of the Premier League season, in a 0–3 win at West Brom, Silva delivered a performance his manager Manuel Pellegrini labelled "unbelievable". As well as assisting the team's third goal, a clever backheel flick on Yaya Touré's long range drive sent the ball spinning into the net. After providing another three assists for the team in August (in wins against Chelsea and Watford), Silva was nominated for both of the Manchester City and Premier League Player of the Month Awards for August, winning the former.

Silva was injured for most of October and November after picking up an ankle injury, while playing for Spain on 9 October. He made his return, as a 75th-minute substitute, in a 3–1 league defeat of Southampton on 28 November. He netted the opener in the last UEFA Champions League group stage match on 8 December, in a 4–2 home defeat of Borussia Mönchengladbach, which resulted in Manchester City topping their group for the first time. Silva provided another three assists in home victories against Tyne-Wear rivals Newcastle United and Sunderland.

Silva warming up before a preseason match against Tottenham in July 2017
In a 4–0 home league win against Crystal Palace on 16 January 2016, Silva scored one, set-up another two goals and played a key pass in the remaining goal. Having started every match of City's League Cup campaign since the quarter-final stage, he started the 2016 Football League Cup Final on 28 February, playing 110 minutes against Liverpool as the match went to extra time. He was replaced 10 minutes from time by Wilfried Bony, and Manchester City went on to defeat the Reds 3-1 on penalties, with Silva winning his second League Cup with the club. He claimed another brace of assists in a 4–0 home defeat of Aston Villa six days later.

On 24 February, Silva scored City's second as they beat Dynamo Kyiv 3-1 in the first leg of their Champions League Round of 16 tie, his second strike of the European campaign. He proceeded to start City's next four games in the competition, as the Blues made their deepest run in history, reaching the semi-finals. However, having started as one of City's brightest players in the semi-final first leg against Real Madrid, Silva was forced off after just 40 minutes due to injury. This caused him to miss the second leg at the Santiago Bernabeu, and his team suffered in his absence- the Blues were beaten 1-0 on the night and on aggregate. Pellegrini lamented the loss of his main playmaker, asserting that the absence of Silva had crippled his side and hamstrung their ability to create chances.

Silva ended the campaign with four goals and 12 assists in 36 matches, a disappointing campaign for him personally, and one in which he missed 22 matches due to a persistent ankle injury, amongst other issues. Nonetheless, it was a trophy-winning season, the ninth major honour of his career.

2016–17: Manchester City Player of the Year
With Pep Guardiola arriving as Manchester City's new manager to much fanfare, it was the beginning of a new era for City. Having put pen to paper on a three-year contract with the Blues, the legendary manager stated that one of the reasons he had come to the club was to work with Silva, whom he described as a special player, and one of the best he had ever trained. In Guardiola's first season at the club, Silva scored one goal in a 5–0 win over Steaua București in the 2016–17 UEFA Champions League play-off round. He enjoyed a relatively productive European campaign that season- having provided an assist for Raheem Sterling against Celtic, he later scored the equalising goal in a 1–1 draw against Borussia Mönchengladbach in the group stage. The Blues progressed to the knockout stages where they would face Monaco in the Round of 16, but despite another pinpoint Silva cross to assist Aguero, City crashed out of the tournament on away goals following a 5-5 aggregate draw.

In the league, despite a bright opening to the campaign when City stormed to the top of the table, it proved a difficult season for the Blues, as they eventually fell away and ended up finishing third, 15 points behind winners Chelsea. It was a season in transition for the team, who under Guardiola were beginning to implement a distinct footballing philosophy.

Despite the team's under-performance, Silva ended the campaign with eight goals and 11 assists in all competitions, and he beat off competition from Sergio Aguero and Kevin De Bruyne to be named Manchester City's Player of the Season. It was his second time being recognised as such, following his winning of the award in 2011-12, with the Spaniard fast becoming one of Pep Guardiola's favourites in the City side.

2017–18: Third Premier League and League Cup win
Silva started the 2017–18 season with yet another display of finesse, providing eight Premier League assists in 14 appearances, which was the highest total for any player in Europe's top five leagues. The 2017–18 season was an especially difficult time for the Spaniard, with his newborn son having been born extremely prematurely. This led to him having to jet back and forth between England and Spain to visit his son and partner in a hospital in Madrid. Despite this, Silva continued to produce excellent performances, and on 30 November 2017, he signed a one-year contract extension with Manchester City keeping him at the club until 2020. On 10 December, Silva scored the winner in a closely fought Manchester Derby at Old Trafford, stabbing the ball past David de Gea from close range.

Silva was forced to miss a crucial game against Tottenham Hotspur at the Etihad Stadium in December, as he was with his son in Spain. In his absence, City delivered a sumptuous performance, smashing Tottenham 4–1 following an urging from manager Pep Guardiola to secure the win for Silva and his partner Yessica. Midfielder Kevin De Bruyne held his fingers up to show the number 21, Silva's shirt number, after scoring City's second, in a touching tribute to the Spaniard. Manchester City ended up winning the Premier League with a record 100 point tally, leading to the team being nicknamed The Centurions. The 19 point gap to second-placed Manchester United was also a record winning margin, which stands to this day.

Silva also scored in the 2018 EFL Cup Final against Arsenal. For his contributions, Silva was nominated for the PFA Player of the Year and named in the PFA Team of the Year for the second time as City won the Premier League. It was the third Premier League title of Silva's career and his second time being named in the PFA Team of the Year, and he finished the season with 10 goals and 14 assists across all competitions.

2018–19: Four titles in one season 
On 15 September 2018, in a 3–0 home win over Fulham, Silva scored his 50th Premier League goal in his 253rd appearance in the competition, also making his 350th appearance for Manchester City in the same match. City and Liverpool went head to head in an absorbing title race, which ended up with City pipping the Reds to the title by a single point.

It was a remarkable season for the Blues, as they went on to win the Community Shield, League Cup and FA Cup too, with Silva scoring in the final of the latter tournament. In doing this, they became the first club in English football history to win all four domestic honours in a single season. Silva played in 33 of City's 38 league games, registering 10 goals and 14 assists in all competitions as he picked up his second FA Cup, fourth League Cup and fourth Premier League title.

2019–20: Fifth League Cup win, departure, statue
Following the departure of Vincent Kompany in 2019, Silva inherited the club captaincy. On 26 June 2019, Silva announced that he would leave Manchester City at the end of the 2019–20 season. The campaign began with City facing Liverpool in the Community Shield at Wembley- City won on penalties following a 1-1 draw, with Silva producing a brilliant pass to assist Raheem Sterling for City's goal. On 8 July, he provided two assists, the second of which was his 10th of the season, and scored a free kick as City beat Newcastle United 5–0. With the free kick goal, he reached 150 Premier League goals and assists, which only a few midfielders had done before.

On 1 March 2020, City took on Aston Villa in the League Cup final, their third such final in as many years and fifth in seven seasons. The Blues won 2-1, with goals from Sergio Aguero and Rodri, and lifted the trophy for the third time in a row. It was Silva's only trophy as captain of Manchester City, and his fifth League Cup title overall, making him the most decorated player in the competition's 60-year history.

On 26 July 2020, Silva played his final Premier League game for Manchester City, a 5–0 win over Norwich City. He was substituted late on in the match, to applause from all present. Just under a month later, he played his last game in a City shirt, in a disappointing 3–1 defeat to Olympique Lyon in the Champions League quarter-finals, coming on as a late substitute. At the age of 34, Silva ended the campaign with a respectable return of six goals and 11 assists in all competitions, enough to earn himself a third appearance in the PFA Team of the Year despite City's underwhelming season.

On 17 August 2020, Manchester City chairman Khaldoon Al Mubarak announced plans for a statue of Silva, along with teammates Sergio Aguero and Vincent Kompany, to be installed at the Etihad Stadium to commemorate his 10-year "transformational" contribution at City.
The statues of Silva and Kompany were unveiled on 28 August 2021.

Real Sociedad 
On 17 August 2020, Spanish club Real Sociedad announced the signing of Silva on a free transfer, despite reports of a move to Italian side Lazio.

Silva made his debut for the club in a 0–0 home draw against Real Madrid, coming on as a substitute in the second half. On 25 October 2020, Silva provided two assists as La Real beat Huesca 4-1 in La Liga. A week later, he scored his first goal for the club, in a 4–1 away win against Celta Vigo. Following his excellent performances for Sociedad, Silva was named in WhoScored's La Liga Team of the Month for November, as well as being named Real Sociedad Player of the Month.

On 21 February 2021, Silva once again provided two assists as Real Sociedad defeated Alaves 4–0 in the league. This propelled La Real to 5th in the table, while Silva became the only player to provide two assists in two different La Liga games that season.

On 3 April 2021, Silva started in and played 85 minutes of the 2020 Copa Del Rey Final against local rivals Athletic Club Bilbao. The match was settled by a 63rd minute penalty from La Real captain Mikel Oyarzabal, after Cristian Portu had been brought down in the box. Silva was substituted late in the game to a standing ovation from the Sociedad bench, and along with his teammates went on to lift the Copa Del Rey, Real Sociedad's first major trophy since 1987. It was the 19th major honour of David Silva's career, and his second Copa Del Rey title. Prior to this final which was postponed, him along with fellow transferred teammate Carlos Fernández never played during the previous rounds of this tournament which took place during the 2019–20 season.

International career

Silva first represented Spain in the 2003 FIFA U-17 World Championship in Finland, scoring three goals. In 2006, he became an under-21 international and scored four goals during the 2005 FIFA World Youth Championship; this was enough to earn him joint-fourth place in the goal ranking, alongside Italian striker Graziano Pellè.

Silva made his senior international debut in the 1–0 friendly home defeat to Romania on 15 November 2006, and continued to receive call-ups to the side after good contributions in his first games. On 22 August 2007, he scored his first two goals for Spain, netting twice in a 3–2 friendly win versus Greece, and was then called up to the squad of 23 for UEFA Euro 2008.

UEFA Euro 2008 
Silva started five of Spain's six matches at Euro 2008. In Spain's second group stage match against Sweden in Innsbruck, he assisted Fernando Torres with a pinpoint cross from the edge of the box, with the Liverpool forward scoring the opener in an eventual 2–1 win.

In the semi-finals game versus Russia, Silva scored the third goal for Spain after a quick counter-attack in which Cesc Fàbregas delivered a low cross, and he sent the ball into Igor Akinfeev's goal with his left foot. In the final, he was involved in an incident with Germany's Lukas Podolski. After he pulled Podolski to the ground, the German approached Silva, which resulted in an angry exchange of words and a coming together of heads that the referee decided not to punish. Shortly afterward, Spanish coach Luis Aragonés substituted Silva for Santi Cazorla in an attempt to calm the tensions.

2010 FIFA World Cup 
After appearing regularly during 2010 FIFA World Cup qualification – Spain won all ten fixtures – Silva was also picked for the squad for the finals in South Africa. His participation was, however, a small one. He started the opening group game for La Furia Roja, against Switzerland in Durban, but despite some bright sparks, the European champions succumbed to a 1–0 defeat.

Silva next appeared for Spain in the semi-final against Germany, replacing Pedro for the final nine minutes. Spain won 1–0, courtesy of a header from Carles Puyol, and went on to win the tournament, beating the Netherlands in the final.

UEFA Euro 2012 Qualifying 
On 11 August 2010, during an international friendly with Mexico, Silva scored two minutes into second-half injury time, ending the game with a 1–1 draw. In a Euro 2012 qualifier against Liechtenstein on 3 September 2010, Silva scored after 62 minutes, in a 4–0 away win. The following month, in the same competition, he scored through a rare header, as the national team downed Lithuania in Salamanca (3–1).In a friendly against Colombia on 9 February 2011, he came off the bench to score the game's only goal with just four minutes remaining, helping Spain to a hard-fought 1–0 win. He scored twice and provided one assist in Spain's 3–1 victory against Scotland in their final match of the Euro 2012 qualifiers. The win saw the Spaniards enter the tournament with a perfect qualifying record by winning all their group games. He scored the first goal in Spain's 2–2 comeback against Costa Rica, a friendly match where he came on as a substitute in the second half with Spain trailing 2–0. He once again scored in a friendly against Venezuela to make the score 2–0 in a match that ended in a 5–0 win. Heading into Euro 2012, he scored in their pre-tournament friendly against China by finishing off a short give and go from Andrés Iniesta in the 84th minute.

UEFA Euro 2012 
Silva was a starter in all six matches of Spain's Euro 2012 campaign. In their opening match of the tournament against Italy, he delivered a superb flicked through ball to Cesc Fabregas, who scored to level the game up at 1–1.

In Spain's second Group C match against the Republic of Ireland, Silva produced one of the performances of the tournament, scoring one and providing two assists in a 4–0 win. His goal was mesmeric, as he left Sean St. Ledger on the floor and beat Stephen Ward before coolly slotting it past former Manchester City teammate Shay Given.

In the 14th minute of the UEFA Euro 2012 Final, he headed home a Cesc Fàbregas cross, giving Spain a 1–0 lead.
The match ended 4–0 and concluded the tournament in which Silva scored two goals and made three assists, the best efficiency (goals and assists) of any player at the Euros. He was subsequently named in UEFA's Euro 2012 Team of the Tournament for his performances. He also finished as the joint highest assist provider at the Euros, with three.

2013 FIFA Confederations Cup 
Silva was named in Vicente del Bosque's 23-man squad list for Spain's contestation of the 2013 FIFA Confederations Cup, held in Brazil. On 20 June 2013, he scored two goals and assisted one for David Villa in Spain's 10–0 group stage demolition of Tahiti at the Maracanã. Spain would go on to reach the 2013 FIFA Confederations Cup Final, where they were soundly beaten 3–0 by hosts Brazil.

2014 FIFA World Cup 
Silva was part of Spain's 23-man squad which traveled to Brazil for the 2014 World Cup. With La Roja looking to defend the title they captured four years ago in South Africa, Silva started the opening match against the Netherlands in Bahia. However, they were unable to repeat their success over the Oranje from 2010, and succumbed to a 5-1 loss, despite taking an early lead.

Silva started the second group stage game, against Chile, playing the full 90 minutes. However, it was another bad outing for the side, who were soundly beaten 2-0 and eliminated from the tournament.

Despite the team's under-performance, Silva was one of the brighter sparks for La Roja, creating seven chances for his team, the most of any Spanish player at the World Cup.

UEFA Euro 2016 
Euro 2016 was one of Silva's best outings for the National Team at a major tournament. Starting in all four matches, Silva began the tournament with a show stopping display against the Czech Republic, in which he created six chances for his team- the most of any Spain player in a single match at the tournament. The game ended in  a 1-0 victory for the reigning European champions.

In the second group game, a clash with Turkey in Nice, Silva was a key cog as Spain produced one of their best performances of the tournament, dispatching the Turks 3-0. Silva was mesmeric throughout, and received a standing ovation from Spain and Turkey fans alike when he was substituted late in the game.

Silva played the full 90 minutes in La Roja's third group stage game against Croatia. It was an exceptional display, with the midfielder playing a sublime through ball to teammate Cesc Fabregas, who squared for Alvaro Morata to score the opener. He later won a penalty, which was missed by Sergio Ramos, as Spain fell to a 2-1 defeat. Despite this, Silva created five chances in the game, the second most of any Spain player in a Euro 2016 match, after himself. Spain were eventually eliminated in the round of 16 by Italy, who beat them 2-0.

Silva ended the tournament averaging 3.3 chances created per 90, the third highest at the tournament.

Later years and retirement 

Silva continued his goal scoring record under new boss Julen Lopetegui, scoring 9 times in 12 matches. In May 2018, Silva was named to Spain's squad for the 2018 FIFA World Cup in Russia. He started all their matches in their World Cup campaign, which eventually ended with a 3–4 penalty shootout defeat to hosts Russia in the Round of 16.

After the 2018 World Cup, Silva announced his retirement from international football. He ended his international career with 125 caps for Spain, having scored 35 goals. Following his retirement, Silva drew plaudits from many of his former teammates, being described as "one of the best ever" and "one of the most talented players Spain has ever produced, without a shadow of a doubt" by midfield partners Andres Iniesta and Xavi Hernandez. Vicente del Bosque, who led Spain to the 2010 World Cup and Euro 2012 titles, even went as far as to declare Silva "Spain's Lionel Messi".

Style of play

A talented and agile left-footed player, Silva is known for having an excellent first touch, good dribbling skills, and outstanding technical ability, which, along with his intelligent attacking movements, allow him to retain possession in tight spaces, and to create space for himself and teammates to open up a defence. His composure on the ball, as well as his vision, passing accuracy, ability to read the game, pick a pass, and control the tempo of his team's play have seen him become one of the best players in the world in his position, as well as one of the best midfielders in Premier League history, and earned him the nicknames Merlin and El Mago.

Although he primarily serves as a playmaker for his team, he is capable of scoring goals himself as well as creating them, which enables him to be deployed in several offensive roles: he is usually fielded in a free role as an attacking midfielder, where he is given space to roam the pitch, but has also been used as a winger, as a false 9, as a second striker or as a deeper-lying central midfielder.

Personal life
During December 2017, Silva had been missing games to return to Spain for personal reasons. On 3 January 2018, he said that his new son, Mateo, had been born extremely prematurely and was fighting to stay alive. On 11 May 2018, Mateo was reported as healthy and was allowed to come home.

On 31 August 2020, he tested positive for COVID-19.

Career statistics

Club

International

Spain score listed first, score column indicates score after each Silva goal.

Honours

Valencia
Copa del Rey: 2007–08

Manchester City
Premier League: 2011–12, 2013–14, 2017–18, 2018–19
FA Cup: 2010–11, 2018–19
Football League/EFL Cup: 2013–14, 2015–16, 2017–18, 2018–19, 2019–20
FA Community Shield: 2012, 2018, 2019

Real Sociedad
Copa del Rey: 2019–20

Spain U19
UEFA European Under-19 Championship: 2004

Spain
FIFA World Cup: 2010
UEFA European Championship: 2008, 2012

Individual
FIFA U-17 World Championship Bronze Ball: 2003
Pedro Zaballa Award: 2005
Premier League Player of the Month: September 2011
Most assists in the Premier League: 2011–12
Manchester City Player of the Season: 2016–17
Manchester City Players' Player of the Season: 2011–12
PFA Team of the Year: 2011–12 Premier League, 2017–18 Premier League, 2019–20 Premier League
UEFA European Championship Team of the Tournament: 2012

Orders
Medalla de Oro de Canarias: 2010
Prince of Asturias Award for Sports: 2010
Gold Medal of the Royal Order of Sporting Merit: 2011

See also
List of footballers with 100 or more caps

References

External links

National team data at BDFutbol
Profile at the Real Sociedad website
Premier League profile

Silva at Goal.com

1986 births
Living people
Spanish people of Japanese descent
People from Mogán
Sportspeople from the Province of Las Palmas
Spanish footballers
Footballers from the Canary Islands
Association football midfielders
Valencia CF Mestalla footballers
Valencia CF players
SD Eibar footballers
RC Celta de Vigo players
Manchester City F.C. players
Real Sociedad footballers
Segunda División B players
Segunda División players
La Liga players
Premier League players
Spain youth international footballers
Spain under-21 international footballers
Spain international footballers
UEFA Euro 2008 players
2009 FIFA Confederations Cup players
2010 FIFA World Cup players
UEFA Euro 2012 players
2013 FIFA Confederations Cup players
2014 FIFA World Cup players
UEFA Euro 2016 players
2018 FIFA World Cup players
FIFA Century Club
UEFA European Championship-winning players
FIFA World Cup-winning players
Spanish expatriate footballers
Spanish expatriate sportspeople in England
Expatriate footballers in England
FA Cup Final players